Billings is a village located south of Frankfurt am Main in the southern part of the German state of Hessen. It has been incorporated into the municipality of Fischbachtal in the district of Darmstadt-Dieburg.

Sister cities
Billings, Montana United States

Villages in Hesse
Darmstadt-Dieburg